Eris Abedini (born 29 August 1998) is a professional footballer who plays as a midfielder for Swiss club Winterthur. Born in Switzerland, he plays for the Kosovo national team.

Club career

Early career
A youth product of Lugano, Abedini begun his senior career with a two-year loan at Chiasso. Abedini made his professional debut for Lugano in a 1–1 Swiss Super League tie with Zürich on 19 May 2018.

Abedini was loaned out to Winterthur on 4 January 2019, for the rest of the season. On 16 July 2019 Abedini joined Wil on a contract until June 2021.

Granada
On 3 October 2020, Abedini joined Segunda División B side Granada B, on a one-year contract with an option for two more season. On 8 November 2020, he was called up from first team for the league match against Real Sociedad at away, becoming the first ever Kosovan to make it to club's first team. He was an unused substitute in Granada defeat 2–0 at Anoeta Stadium.

Winterthur
On 29 December 2021, he signed a contract with Winterthur until the summer of 2023.

International career
Abedini was born in Switzerland and is of Kosovan Albanian descent. Abedini was a youth international for Switzerland before switching allegiance to Kosovo. He debuted with the senior Kosovo national team in a friendly 2–2 tie with Armenia on 16 November 2022.

References

External links
 
 
 SFL Profile

1998 births
Living people
People from Sorengo
Kosovan footballers
Kosovo international footballers
Kosovo under-21 international footballers
Swiss men's footballers
Switzerland youth international footballers
Swiss people of Kosovan descent
Association football midfielders
FC Lugano players
FC Chiasso players
FC Winterthur players
FC Wil players
Swiss Super League players
Swiss Challenge League players
Club Recreativo Granada players
Kosovan expatriate footballers
Swiss expatriate footballers
Kosovan expatriate sportspeople in Spain
Swiss expatriate sportspeople in Spain
Expatriate footballers in Spain
Sportspeople from Ticino